Keep Your Head Up, Kid: The Don Cherry Story is a 2010 two-part biographical television mini-series about Don Cherry.

Details
The mini-series was directed by Jeff Woolnough and written by Don Cherry's son, Tim Cherry. It originally aired March 2010 on CBC Television. It took six years for Tim Cherry to get permission from his father to film the series. It covers Cherry's life mainly from his lengthy career as a minor-league hockey player through the end of his tenure coaching the Boston Bruins, ending with a brief montage of more recent events.

Sequel
In 2011, CBC filmed a two-part mini-series, The Wrath of Grapes: The Don Cherry Story II, a sequel to Keep Your Head Up, Kid. It was also directed by Woolnough and written by Andrew Wreggitt, with all of the main cast reprising their roles. It aired in March 2012.

Cast
 Jared Keeso as Don Cherry
 Sarah Manninen as Rose Cherry
 Stephen McHattie as Eddie Shore

References

External links

2010s Canadian television miniseries
Films set in the 1960s
Films set in the 1970s
Films shot in Manitoba
Films directed by Jeff Woolnough